January 23 - Eastern Orthodox liturgical calendar - January 25

All fixed commemorations below are observed on February 6 by Eastern Orthodox Churches on the Old Calendar.

For January 24th, Orthodox Churches on the Old Calendar commemorate the Saints listed on January 11.

Saints
 Hieromartyr Babylas of Sicily and his two disciples martyrs Timothy and Agapius (3rd century)
 Martyrs Paul, Pausirius, and Theodotian, brothers, of Egypt (3rd century)
 Martyrs Barsimos of Syria, and his two brothers, by the sword, in Persia.
 Martyr Philippicus the Presbyter.
 Martyr Chrysoploki (Chrysoploca).
 Saint Helladios the Commentarisius (prison warden).  (see also: January 18)
 Martyrs Hermogenes and Menas (Mamas, Mamatos).  (see also: December 10)
 Saints Hermogenes and Philemon, Bishop of Karpathos.
 Venerable Macedonius of Syria, hermit of Mt. Silpius, near Antioch (ca. 420)
 Saint Saint Xenia the Righteous of Rome and her two female slaves (5th century)
 Saint Philon (Philonas), Wonderworking Bishop of Karpasia on Cyprus (5th century)
 Venerable Zosimas, ascetic of the desert.
 Saint Zosimas of Cilicia, Bishop of Babylon in Egypt (6th century)

Pre-Schism Western saints
 Saint Felician of Foligno, Bishop of Foligno in Italy (254)
 Saint Zamas, first Bishop of Bologna in Italy (ca. 268)
 Saint Artemius (Arthemius), Bishop of Clermont (396)
 Saint Exuperantius of Cingoli, Bishop of Cingoli near Ancona in Italy (5th century)
 Saint Guasacht, converted by Patrick, whom he helped as Bishop of Granard in Ireland (5th century)
 Saint Lupicinus of Lipidiaco (Gaul) (500)
 Venerable martyr Cadoc (Docus, Cathmael, Cadvaci), founder of the monastery of Llancarfan not far from Cardiff in Wales, and hermit (ca.580)
 Saint Suranus, Abbot of a monastery at Sora near Caserta, martyred by the Lombards (ca. 580)
 Saint Bertrand (Bertram, Bertran, Ebertram), a disciple of St Bertinus, helped St. Omer enlighten the north of France and Flanders, later became Abbot of Saint-Quentin (7th century)
 Saint Erembert I, Abbot of Kremsmünster Abbey in Austria (ca. 1050)

Post-Schism Orthodox saints
 Venerable Neophytus the Recluse, of Cyprus, Wonderworker (1204)
 Saint Gerasimus of Perm, Bishop of Perm (1441)
 Martyr John of Kazan (1529)
 Venerable Dionysius of Olympus, and Mt. Athos, Wonderworker (1541)  (see also: January 23)
 Blessed Xenia of St. Petersburg, Fool-for-Christ (1806)
 Saint Sophia, first Abbess of Shamordino Convent (1888)

New martyrs and confessors
 Martyr Nicholas Tsikura (1918)

Other commemorations
 Translation of the relics (632) of Monk-martyr Anastasius the Persian (628)
 Dedication of the Church of St. Zacharias, in Constantinople, founded by St. Domnica of Constantinople (5th century)
 Dedication of the Church of the Holy Prophet and Forerunner John the Baptist, near Taurus.
 Repose of Bishop Nektary (Kontzevitch) of Seattle (1983)
 Commemoration of the Seven Venerable Saints of Philotheou monastery:
 Philotheos, master builder of the monastery; Theodosius, Igumen and Metropolitan of Trebizond; Dionysius and Symeon; Dometios the Hesychast; Damianos; and hieromartyr Cosmas of Aetolia, Equal to the Apostles.

Icon gallery

Notes

References

Sources
 January 24 / February 6. Orthodox Calendar (PRAVOSLAVIE.RU).
 February 6 / January 24. HOLY TRINITY RUSSIAN ORTHODOX CHURCH (A parish of the Patriarchate of Moscow).
 January 24. OCA - The Lives of the Saints.
 The Autonomous Orthodox Metropolia of Western Europe and the Americas (ROCOR). St. Hilarion Calendar of Saints for the year of our Lord 2004. St. Hilarion Press (Austin, TX). pp. 9–10.
 January 24. Latin Saints of the Orthodox Patriarchate of Rome.
 The Roman Martyrology. Transl. by the Archbishop of Baltimore. Last Edition, According to the Copy Printed at Rome in 1914. Revised Edition, with the Imprimatur of His Eminence Cardinal Gibbons. Baltimore: John Murphy Company, 1916. pp. 24–25.
Greek Sources
 Great Synaxaristes:  24 ΙΑΝΟΥΑΡΙΟΥ. ΜΕΓΑΣ ΣΥΝΑΞΑΡΙΣΤΗΣ.
  Συναξαριστής. 24 Ιανουαρίου. ECCLESIA.GR. (H ΕΚΚΛΗΣΙΑ ΤΗΣ ΕΛΛΑΔΟΣ). 
Russian Sources
  6 февраля (24 января). Православная Энциклопедия под редакцией Патриарха Московского и всея Руси Кирилла (электронная версия). (Orthodox Encyclopedia - Pravenc.ru).
  24 января (ст.ст.) 6 февраля 2013 (нов. ст.). Русская Православная Церковь Отдел внешних церковных связей. (DECR).

January in the Eastern Orthodox calendar